Dickins is a surname. Notable people with the surname include:
 Alan Dickins, Arundel Herald of Arms Extraordinary
 Barry Dickins (born 1949), Australian author, artist and playwright
 Bruce Dickins FBA (1889–1978), Elrington and Bosworth Professor of Anglo-Saxon, Cambridge University
 Frederick Victor Dickins (1838–1915), British surgeon, barrister, orientalist and university administrator
 George Dickins (1821–1903), English cricketer and soldier
 John Dickins (1746–1798), early Methodist preacher in the United States
 Matt Dickins (born 1970), English professional goalkeeper
 Michael Dickins Ford (born 1928), art director in film and commercial television
 Punch Dickins OC OBE DFC (1899–1995), pioneering Canadian aviator and bush pilot
 Rob Dickins (born 1950), formerly chairman of Warner Music UK, founder of Instant Karma and Dharma Music
 Zara Dickins DBE (1909–1989), Australian fashion designer, wife (later widow) of Prime Minister Harold Holt of Australia

See also
 Dickens (disambiguation)
 Charles Dickens, English writer
 Dickins & Jones or Dickins & Jones, high-quality department store in London, England
 Dickins Hill, fictional prison in the BBC soap opera EastEnders
 Dillon & Dickins, Dance music production group based in London, United Kingdom

English-language surnames
Patronymic surnames
Surnames from given names